Duces 'n Trayz: The Old Fashioned Way is the second and latest studio album by American rap group Tha Eastsidaz, released on July 30, 2001. The album features the single "I Luv It" and includes the song "Crip Hop" which was also featured in the film, Baby Boy and the corresponding soundtrack.

Critical reception

The album overall received positive reviews from music critics.

Commercial performance 
Duces 'n Trayz: The Old Fashioned Way debuted at number 4 on the US Billboard 200, selling 116,000 copies in its first week. The album stayed on the chart for nine consecutive weeks. The album peaked at number 15 the previous week on the Canada Top 50 Albums chart for four weeks in a row. It was certificated gold on March 11, 2002

Track listing

Samples 
I Luv It
 "Mr. Groove" by One Way

Crip Hop
 "Square Biz" by Teena Marie
 "Ambitionz Az a Ridah" by 2Pac

Friends
 "At Long Last" by Moment of Truth. Composers Norman Bergen and Reid Whitelaw

Charts

Weekly charts

Year-end charts

Certifications

References

External links 
 [ Duces 'n Trayz: The Old Fashioned Way] at Allmusic
 Duces 'n Trayz: The Old Fashioned Way at Discogs

2001 albums
Snoop Dogg albums
Tray Deee albums
Albums produced by the Alchemist (musician)
Albums produced by Battlecat (producer)
Albums produced by Fredwreck
Albums produced by Hi-Tek
Albums produced by JellyRoll
Albums produced by Rick Rock
Albums produced by Keith Clizark
Albums produced by Swizz Beatz
Tha Eastsidaz albums
Collaborative albums